John Keells Holdings PLC (JKH) is one of the largest conglomerate companies in Sri Lanka. From managing hotels and resorts in Sri Lanka and the Maldives to providing port, marine fuel and logistics services to IT solutions, manufacturing of food and beverages to running a chain of supermarkets, tea broking to stock broking, life insurance and banking to real estate, the Group of companies has made its presence felt in virtually every major sphere of the economy.

JKH is a full member of the World Economic Forum and has issued Global Depository Receipts on the Luxembourg Stock Exchange, and was the first Sri Lankan company to be listed overseas. As a Member of the Global Compact – the United Nations-sponsored international corporate citizenship initiative, JKH is also committed to sustainable development and greater social responsibility, in a multi-stakeholder context. Keells continues its position as the most valuable company in Sri Lanka since the 1980s.

History

Edwin and George John founded John Keells in the 1870s. They incorporated the company in Colombo, Ceylon with the name E.John & Co. In 1960 they changed the name to John Keells. It was initially set up as a manufacturer of tea and essential foods. In 1948 E. John & Co. merged with two UK based companies including Thompson and White & Co. Ltd.

During the 1970s and 1980s, the company mainly focussed on new opportunities in the tourist industry. In 1986, the name was changed again, from John Keells Ltd to John Keells Holdings Ltd. In 1986/87 John Keells went public.

Shareholding 
The number of shares of John Keells is approximately 1.32 Billion. In 2021, the share price of JKH reached Rs. 147. The promoter group, the  SK Captain family, hold 11.62% of the total shares whereas the remaining 88.38% shares are held by public shareholders, including Citigroup.

Listing 
The company's equity shares have been listed on the Colombo Stock Exchange since the 1980s. As of 2021, JKH's market capitalization stood at Rs195 billion, making it the largest company in Sri Lanka. Approximately 6% of its total market cap. In 1994 the Global Depository Receipts issued by the company were listed on the Luxembourg Stock Exchange.

Company has received domestic credit rating of AAA (lka) from Fitch. It was to become the 10th most valuable brand in Sri Lanka worth Rs. US$103 million in 2020 (excluding Elephant House).

Businesses and investments

Transportation Sector 
John Keells' total revenue from logistics was 10%, from transporting 12% and 5% from supply chain management.

John Keells Logistics (Pvt) Ltd. is a logistic, supply chain management and transportation management company. It is a subsidiary of John Keells. It is a recipient of the ISO 9001:2015 and ISO 45001:2018 certifications.

Mackinnons is one of the oldest logistic companies in Sri Lanka. It was founded by India Steamship Company in 1917. Mackinnons Group was acquired by John Keells in the 1970s.

Startup Accelerator 
John Keells Holdings launched John Keells X in 2016 to boost creative and intellectual business talent in Sri Lanka via a competitive programme conceptualized and administered by John Keells Holdings PLC. It includes investment in Blue lotus 360, DirectPay, HeliosP2P, SenzAgro.

Financial

References

 
Conglomerate companies of Sri Lanka
Hospitality companies of Sri Lanka
Companies listed on the Colombo Stock Exchange